Ceillac is a commune in the Hautes-Alpes department in southeastern France.

Geography

Climate
Ceillac has a humid continental climate (Köppen climate classification Dfb).

Population

See also
Communes of the Hautes-Alpes department

References

External links
Official site

Communes of Hautes-Alpes